Minnesota State Highway 38 (MN 38) is a  highway in north-central Minnesota, which runs from its intersection with U.S. Highway 2 in Grand Rapids and continues north to its northern terminus at its intersection with State Highway 1 in Effie.

The entire length of Highway 38 has been designated a National Scenic Byway under the name Edge of the Wilderness. It is also sometimes called the Northwoods Highway.

Route description
State Highway 38 serves as a north–south route between Grand Rapids and Effie in north-central Minnesota.  The route is noted for being a twisty roadway.

The route passes through many lake resort areas, such as Wabana Lake, Trout Lake, and others.

Highway 38 passes through the Chippewa National Forest between Itasca County Road 19 and Bigfork.

Scenic State Park is located 7 miles east of the junction of Highway 38 and County Road 7 at Bigfork. The park entrance is located on County Road 7.

Highway 38 parallels State Highway 6 throughout its route.

History

State Highway 38 was authorized in 1933.

The route was completely paved by 1940.

Major intersections

References

038
Transportation in Itasca County, Minnesota
Chippewa National Forest